The Xavier Chevalier House is a historic house located on Gosier Road in Cape Vincent, Jefferson County, New York.

Description and history 
The limestone farmhouse was built in 1852 by Xavier Chevalier, and consists of three sections: a front, gabled, three-bay wide -story main block; a gabled, one-story side wing; and a small cinder block lean-to. Also on the property is a mid-19th-century saltbox barn and a mid-19th-century limestone smokehouse.

It was listed on the National Register of Historic Places on September 27, 1985.

References

Houses on the National Register of Historic Places in New York (state)
Houses completed in 1852
Houses in Jefferson County, New York
National Register of Historic Places in Jefferson County, New York
1852 establishments in New York (state)